Murder at the Presidio is a 2005 American made-for-TV murder mystery film directed by John Fasano and starring Lou Diamond Phillips, Victoria Pratt and Martin Cummins. Phillips plays a military detective investigating a robbery-homicide in the Presidio military base in San Francisco. Principal photography for the film was done in Victoria, British Columbia, Canada.

The film was released on DVD on August 9, 2005. Scott Weinberg of DVD Talk gave the film 2.5 out of 5 stars and judged its replay value worth 1 out of 5 stars. He said the film was too predictable, likening it to an episode of Murder, She Wrote.

Cast
 Lou Diamond Phillips as Chief Warrant Officer James Chandler
 Victoria Pratt as Corporal Tara Jeffries
 Martin Cummins as Sergeant Barry Atkins
 Eugene Clark as Captain Donovan
 Kim Hawthorne as Barbara Owens
 Leslie Easterbrook as Thelma 'Bunny' Atkins
 Daniel Roebuck as Major Dawson
 Jason Priestley as Tom
 Luciana Carro as Corporal Diana Phillips
 Vincent Gale as Private Brooks
 Ona Grauer as Kathy Tucker
 G. Michael Gray as David Raymer
 Julie Johnson as Corporal Valerie Irving
 Blu Mankuma as Assistant District Attorney 
 Jon Mikl Thor as Thor
 Zak Santiago as Private Sulway
 Peter Sherayko as Detective Robert Sayer
 Stefanie von Pfetten as Fran Atkins
 Dean Wray as Steve Wilson
 David Cubitt as Private Arch Dwyer (uncredited)
 Todd Whalen as Corporal Grubbs (uncredited)

See also 
 The Presidio

References

External links 
 
 

American mystery films
American television films
2005 films
Films directed by John Fasano
2000s American films